The 2004 Virginia Tech Hokies football represented the Virginia Tech in the 2004 NCAA Division I-A football season.  Virginia Tech won the Atlantic Coast Conference championship in its inaugural year in the conference, running off a streak of eight straight wins to end the regular season after a 2–2 start. Tech finished 10th in the final Associated Press poll with a 10–3 record. The team's head coach was Frank Beamer, who was named ACC Coach of the Year.

Virginia Tech began the season unranked nationally, having suffered a meltdown at the end of the 2003 season.  The Hokies faced a daunting schedule, beginning with a nationally televisioned game against the defending national co-champion USC Trojans. That game, known as the BCA Classic, was the first NCAA college football game of the year, and would be followed by a tough conference schedule.

Tech lost to eventual BCS National Champion USC at FedExField in Landover, Maryland, 24-13, losing the lead late in the third quarter. After a 63-0 shellacking of Western Michigan, Tech played its first ever ACC game on September 18, against Duke. Tech prevailed 41-17 in Lane Stadium. The Hokies dropped to 2-2 following a 17-16 home loss to N.C. State, in which the Hokies missed a would-be winning field goal as time expired. The team then needed to win five of its next eight games to extend its 11-season streak of playing in a post-season bowl game.

After reeling off three-straight wins, including a 19-13 squeaker over then #7 West Virginia, the Hokies' fortunes looked bleak in the fourth quarter of their game against Georgia Tech in Atlanta on ESPN Thursday night college football. Tech was down 14-0 at one point and trailed 20-12 with 5:28 left in the fourth quarter. Tech racked up 22 unanswered points to exterminate the Yellow Jackets.

Tech would go on to win their remaining regular-season games, including a 24-10 win over then #16 Virginia in Lane Stadium and a 16-10 away victory over then #9 Miami, to clinch the ACC Championship. As ACC Champions, Virginia Tech was awarded a bid to the 2005 Sugar Bowl, a Bowl Championship Series game in New Orleans, Louisiana. Virginia Tech faced Auburn, a team that had gone undefeated in the regular season but was denied a bid to the national championship game by virtue of its lower rank in the BCS poll. In a game that was not decided until the final two minutes, Virginia Tech lost to Auburn 16-13.

Tech was led by quarterback Bryan Randall during the season. Randall was named ACC player of the Year.

Schedule

Rankings

Personnel

Coaching staff

Roster

References

Virginia Tech
Virginia Tech Hokies football seasons
Atlantic Coast Conference football champion seasons
Virginia Tech Hokies football